Maria Rosa da Costa Pedro (born 29 December 1982) is a retired Angolan handball player. She plays for the club Atlético Luanda, and on the Angolan national team. She represented Angola at the 2013 World Women's Handball Championship in Serbia.

References

External links

Angolan female handball players
1982 births
Living people
Olympic handball players of Angola
Handball players at the 2004 Summer Olympics
Handball players at the 2008 Summer Olympics
African Games gold medalists for Angola
African Games medalists in handball
Competitors at the 2011 All-Africa Games